The lumbar branch of the iliolumbar artery (ramus lumbalis) supplies the psoas major and quadratus lumborum, anastomoses with the last lumbar artery, and sends a small spinal branch through the intervertebral foramen between the last lumbar vertebra and the sacrum, into the vertebral canal to supply the cauda equina.

Arteries of the abdomen